Buellia abstracta (synonym – Buellia sequax) is a crustose lichen.

In California, it is the most commonly occurring member of the Buellia genus, and is common in the Mojave Desert.

See also
List of Buellia species

References

abstracta
Lichen species
Lichens of North America
Lichens described in 1883
Taxa named by William Nylander (botanist)